Sticky mouse is a murine possessing a gene mutation in the enzyme alanyl-tRNA synthetase (AARS). The sticky mouse, with this particular mutation, presents a good model in which to investigate mechanisms of neuronal degeneration. Its most immediately obvious symptom is a sticky secretion on the mouse's fur (thus the name); however, it is accompanied by lack of muscle control, ataxia, alopecia, loss of Purkinje cells in the cerebellum, and eventually, death.

Sticky mouse is one of several animal mutants that are known to have problems in mRNA translation and are used in studies.

See also 
 Wasted mouse (wst) - EEF1A2 defect
 Harlequin mouse
 Reeler - RELN defect
 Shaking rat Kawasaki - RELN defect

References

External links 
 A sticky wicket - editor's summary, Nature, 2006
 Forward Genetics Reveals Novel Mechanisms of Neurodegeneration - free online videolecture by Ackerman SL.; June 2009
 'Sticky' mice lead to discovery of new cause of neurodegenerative disease - Howard Hughes Medical Institute, 2006
 Susan L. Ackerman - bio at the Institute site

Rodent diseases
Laboratory mouse strains
Behavioural genetics